Apollon Filippovich Golovachyov (17 July 1831, — 27 October 1877) was a Russian journalist, literary critic, publicist, publisher and editor.

Having debuted as published author in 1860, the Moscow newspaper Nashe Vremya, he went on to contribute to Russkaya Rech, Russky Invalid, and, in particular, Sovremennik which in 1863—1865 he was a secretary of. He went on to co-edit Narodnaya Letopis with Yuliy Zhukovsky, and later worked as staff member for several magazines, including Vek, Birzhevyie Vedomosti, Detskoye Chteniye (edited by his brother Grigory Golovachyov) and Severny Vestnik. In 1865 he purchased the printing facilities and started to publish the works of Russian authors (among them Vasily Kurochkin), as well as translations, including those of John Stuart Mill, Charles Darwin and Pierre-Joseph Proudhon. In 1877, at the outset of the Russo-Turkish War, Golovachyov, now terminally ill, went to the frontline as a war correspondent for Severny Vestnik. He died of tuberculosis on 27 October 1877, in Saint Petersburg and was interred in Volkovo Cemetery, the Literatorskiye Mostki section.

In 1866 Golovachov married Avdotya Panayeva. The novelist Yevdokiya Nagrodskaya (1866-1930) was their daughter.

References 

Russian journalists
Russian editors
Russian literary critics
People from Tver Governorate
1831 births
1877 deaths